Reşat Çiğiltepe (1879; Istanbul - August 27, 1922; Çiğiltepe, Sandıklı) was an officer of the Ottoman Army and the Turkish Army.
He committed suicide on 27 August 1922 during the Battle of Dumlupınar, because he promised his commander, Mustafa Kemal Atatürk, that he would capture the strategically-located village of Hacan within 30 minutes.  Because his unit couldn't reach that objective, he committed suicide. The village was captured 45 minutes after his death, and later renamed "Çiğiltepe" in his honor.  He is one of the most honored heroes of the Turkish War of Independence.

See also
List of high-ranking commanders of the Turkish War of Independence

Sources

1876 births
1922 suicides
Military personnel from Istanbul
Ottoman Military Academy alumni
Ottoman Army officers
Ottoman military personnel of the Italo-Turkish War
Ottoman military personnel of the Balkan Wars
Ottoman military personnel of World War I
Ottoman prisoners of war
World War I prisoners of war held by the United Kingdom
Turkish military personnel of the Greco-Turkish War (1919–1922)
Recipients of the Medal of Independence with Red Ribbon (Turkey)
Burials at Turkish State Cemetery